Brown County is a county in the U.S. state of Nebraska. As of the 2010 United States Census, the population was 3,145. Its county seat is Ainsworth. The county was established in 1883 and named for two members of the legislature who reported the bill for the county's organization.

In the Nebraska license plate system, Brown County is represented by the prefix 75 (it had the 75th-largest number of vehicles registered in the county when the license plate system was established in 1922).

Geography

Brown County is located in Nebraska's Outback region.

Major highways
  U.S. Highway 20
  U.S. Highway 183
  Nebraska Highway 7

Adjacent counties
 Keya Paha County - north
 Rock County - east
 Loup County - southeast
 Blaine County - south
 Cherry County - west

National protected area
 Niobrara National Scenic River (part)

Demographics

As of the 2000 United States Census, there were 3,525 people, 1,530 households, and 996 families in the county. The population density was 3 people per square mile (1/km2). There were 1,916 housing units at an average density of 2 per square mile (1/km2). The racial makeup of the county was 98.64% White, 0.03% Black or African American, 0.20% Native American, 0.26% Asian, 0.03% Pacific Islander, 0.23% from other races, and 0.62% from two or more races.  0.82% of the population were Hispanic or Latino of any race. 43.0% were of German, 11.7% American, 11.6% English and 8.2% Irish ancestry according to Census 2000.

There were 1,530 households, out of which 26.60% had children under the age of 18 living with them, 57.00% were married couples living together, 5.90% had a female householder with no husband present, and 34.90% were non-families. 31.60% of all households were made up of individuals, and 16.90% had someone living alone who was 65 years of age or older. The average household size was 2.27 and the average family size was 2.86.

The county population contained 24.80% under the age of 18, 5.20% from 18 to 24, 22.80% from 25 to 44, 24.70% from 45 to 64, and 22.50% who were 65 years of age or older. The median age was 43 years. For every 100 females there were 96.50 males. For every 100 females age 18 and over, there were 92.30 males.

The median income for a household in the county was $28,356, and the median income for a family was $35,029. Males had a median income of $23,986 versus $17,135 for females. The per capita income for the county was $15,924. About 8.50% of families and 11.10% of the population were below the poverty line, including 14.70% of those under age 18 and 6.80% of those age 65 or over.

Politics
The voters of Brown County have been solidly Republican since its founding. As of 2020, only once has the county voted for the Democratic Party candidate in a national election since 1916.

Communities

Cities 
 Ainsworth (county seat)
 Long Pine

Village 

 Johnstown

See also
 National Register of Historic Places listings in Brown County, Nebraska

References

External links

 Brown County official website
 

 
Nebraska counties
1883 establishments in Nebraska
Populated places established in 1883